National Highway 655, commonly referred to as NH 655 is a national highway in India. It is a secondary route of National Highway 55.  NH-655 runs in the state of Odisha in India.

Route 
NH655 connects Angul (Angul Stadium), Mahidharpur, Satmile, Rasol, Bhapur, Athagarh, Gopinathapur, Totapada and Krushnashyampur in the state of Odisha.

Junctions  
 
  Terminal near Angul.
  Terminal near Krushnashyampur.

See also 
 List of National Highways in India
 List of National Highways in India by state

References

External links 

 NH 655 on OpenStreetMap

National highways in India
National Highways in Odisha